Lowry Hill East is a neighborhood in southwest Minneapolis, Minnesota, United States, part of the Calhoun Isles community. Lowry Hill East developed in the 1880s along a horse-drawn streetcar line built by Thomas Lowry. The interior of the neighborhood is residential, with large early 20th century homes and multi-unit apartment buildings, while the border streets are lined with bars, restaurants, grocery stores, coffeeshops, and other small businesses. Most housing is renter-occupied.

It is bounded on the east by Lyndale Avenue, on the west by Hennepin Avenue and on the south by Lake Street. Lyndale and Hennepin intersect on the northern side at Interstate 94. This creates a neighborhood roughly triangular in shape, which is how it gets its nickname, "the Wedge." It is part of a larger area south of Franklin Avenue and west of Nicollet Avenue that is often considered Uptown, although officially Uptown is a smaller area centered on the intersection of Hennepin and Lake.

In 2020, the population of the neighborhood was 9,298. The neighborhood was 67.9% White, 14.0% Black or African American, 8.4% Asian or Pacific Islander, 5.1% Hispanic or Latino of any race and 3.1% two or more races,. It had a much higher percentage of single residents than other neighborhoods in Minneapolis, a higher percentage of renters, and a lower percentage of families with children. The median household income was $57,802.

Lowry Hill East is bordered by Loring Park and Stevens Square to the northeast, Whittier to the east, Lyndale to the southeast, South Uptown to the south, East Bde Maka Ska to the southwest, East Isles to the west, and Lowry Hill to the northwest.

References

External links
Businesses in Lowry Hill East, Minneapolis
Minneapolis Neighborhood Profile - Lowry Hill East
Lowry Hill East Neighborhood Association

Neighborhoods in Minneapolis
Hipster neighborhoods